The 1964 Victorian state election was held on 27 June 1964.

Retiring Members

Labor
Bill Galvin MLA (Bendigo)

Liberal and Country
Wilfred Mibus MLA (Lowan)
Horace Petty MLA (Toorak)
Gordon Scott MLA (Ballarat South)
Sir Arthur Warner MLC (Higinbotham)

Country
Richard Brose MLA (Rodney)
Bill Fulton MLC (Gippsland)
Dudley Walters MLC (Northern)

Legislative Assembly
Sitting members are shown in bold text. Successful candidates are highlighted in the relevant colour. Where there is possible confusion, an asterisk (*) is also used.

Legislative Council
Sitting members are shown in bold text. Successful candidates are highlighted in the relevant colour. Where there is possible confusion, an asterisk (*) is also used.

References

Psephos - Adam Carr's Election Archive

Victoria
Candidates for Victorian state elections